Cujo is a 1983 American horror film based on Stephen King's 1981 novel of the same name and directed by Lewis Teague. It was written by Don Carlos Dunaway and Barbara Turner (using the pen name Lauren Currier), and starring Dee Wallace, Daniel Hugh Kelly and Danny Pintauro.

The film follows a mother and her son who are trapped inside their car, while protecting themselves from a rabid St. Bernard.

Despite mixed reviews and modest box office receipts during its theatrical release, the film has gathered a cult following in the years since its release. It was released four months before Christine, another Stephen King story released theatrically the same year.

Plot 
Cujo, a friendly and easygoing St. Bernard, chases a wild rabbit and inserts his head into a cave, where a rabid bat bites him on the nose. Meanwhile, the Trenton family — advertising executive Vic, housewife Donna, and their sensitive young son Tad — take their car to the rural home of abusive mechanic Joe Camber for some repairs, where they meet Cujo, the Camber family's pet, and get along well with him.

Donna notices Cujo's bitten nose but thinks little of it. Later, Vic and Donna's marriage is tested when Vic learns that Donna had been having an affair with her ex-boyfriend from high school, Steve Kemp, while Vic's advertising for a cereal commercial is failing. The early signs of Cujo's infection start to appear, including sensitivity to loud noises, and irritability, though no one notices these changes in his behavior. Charity and Brett, Joe's wife and son, leave the house for a week to visit Charity's sister Holly. On the morning of their departure, the furious stage of the infection begins to set in; though Cujo refrains from attacking Brett, he soon goes completely mad and kills the Cambers' alcoholic neighbor Gary Pervier. Shortly afterwards, Joe goes to Gary's house and finds him dead, then tries to call the authorities just before Cujo appears and attacks him.

Vic goes out of town on a business trip, as Donna and Tad return to the Cambers' house for more car repairs. Cujo attacks them, and they are forced to take shelter in their Ford Pinto. Donna tries to drive home, but the car's alternator dies and the two are trapped inside. The hot sun makes conditions nearly unbearable, and Donna realizes that she must do something before they both die from heatstroke or dehydration. However, attempts at escape are foiled by Cujo repeatedly attacking the car, breaking a window in the process, and even biting Donna. Vic returns home to rekindle his marriage, only to find Donna and Tad missing and his house vandalized by Kemp. He suspects the possessive Kemp of kidnapping, but the police realize his wife and son might be at the Cambers house.

The local sheriff, George Bannerman, arrives at the mechanic's house and has a brief standoff; before he can draw his gun, Cujo kills him, knocking him off the catwalk in the barn and mauling him to death. Later, Donna attempts to get to the house to bring a dehydrated and overheated Tad water but is stopped by Cujo; she fights him off with a baseball bat until it breaks, leaving only a jagged handle. Cujo jumps at her and is impaled in the stomach by the broken bat. Donna takes the sheriff's gun and contemplates shooting him, but decides saving Tad is more important. After Donna revives Tad inside the kitchen, Cujo, still alive, breaks through the kitchen window and tries to attack Donna. However, Donna shoots Cujo dead before Vic arrives and reunites with his family.

Cast 
 Dee Wallace as Donna Trenton
 Danny Pintauro as Tad Trenton
 Daniel Hugh-Kelly as Vic Trenton
 Christopher Stone as Steve Kemp
 Ed Lauter as Joe Camber
 Kaiulani Lee as Charity Camber
 Billy Jacoby as Brett Camber
 Mills Watson as Gary Pervier
 Jerry Hardin as Masen
 Sandy Ward as Sheriff George Bannerman
 Arthur Rosenberg as Roger Breakstone

Production 

The original director was Peter Medak, who left the project two days into filming, along with DOP Anthony B. Richmond. They were replaced by Lewis Teague and Jan de Bont respectively. Cujo was played by four St. Bernards, several mechanical dogs, and a black Labrador-Great Dane mix in a St. Bernard costume. In some shots, stuntman Gary Morgan played Cujo while wearing a large dog costume. Karl Miller was the trainer for the dogs in Cujo.

Reception

Box office 
Cujo was a modest box office success for Warner Brothers. The film was released August 12, 1983, in the United States, opening in second place that weekend. It grossed a total of $21,156,152 domestically, making it the fourth-highest-grossing horror film of 1983 behind Jaws 3-D, Psycho II, and Twilight Zone: The Movie.

Critical response 
Reviews from critics were mixed. Janet Maslin of The New York Times wrote the film was "by no means a horror classic, but it's suspenseful and scary". Variety panned it as "a dull, uneventful entry in the horror genre, a film virtually devoid of surprises or any original suspense". Gene Siskel of the Chicago Tribune gave the film one star out of four, calling it "one of the dumbest, flimsiest excuses for a movie I have ever seen". Roger Ebert called it "dreadful", and Linda Gross of the Los Angeles Times wrote that "no theater is air conditioned enough to justify watching this scary, gory and beastly movie".

Steve Jenkins of The Monthly Film Bulletin wrote that "for the most part Cujo works very effectively as a near reductio ad absurdum of the woman-in-peril-mode", but disliked that the film changed the ending from the book, thinking it made "absolutely no sense in terms of the film's logic". Author and film critic Leonard Maltin gave the film three out of a possible four stars, calling it "genuinely frightening" also writing: "Builds slowly but surely to [its] terrifying (but not gory) climax". Despite the mixed reception, Stephen King called the film "terrific" and named it one of his favorite adaptations.

On review aggregation website Rotten Tomatoes, it holds a 60% approval rating based on 43 reviews, with the website's consensus stating: "Cujo is artless work punctuated with moments of high canine gore and one wild Dee Wallace performance". On Metacritic, the film holds a 57/100 based on reviews from 8 critics, indicating "mixed or average reviews".

Additional adaptation 
In 2015, Sunn Classic Pictures announced that it would develop another adaptation titled C.U.J.O., which stands for "Canine Unit Joint Operations". Nothing came of it after its announcement.

See also 

 The Doberman Gang (1972)
 Trapped (1973 film)
 Dogs (1976)
 The Pack (1977)
 Devil Dog: The Hound of Hell (1978)
 Dracula's Dog (1978)
 White Dog (1982)
 Dogs of Hell (1982)
 Man's Best Friend (1993 film) 
 Rottweiler (2004)
 The Breed (2006 film) 
 The Pack (2015 film)
 List of natural horror films

References

External links 
 
 
 
 

1983 films
1983 horror films
1980s horror thriller films
1980s monster movies
American horror thriller films
American monster movies
American natural horror films
1980s English-language films
Films about animals
Films about dogs
Films based on American horror novels
Films based on works by Stephen King
Films directed by Lewis Teague
Films scored by Charles Bernstein
Films set in Maine
Warner Bros. films
Rabies in popular culture
Taft Entertainment Pictures films
1980s American films